The memory hole is a concept in George Orwell's Nineteen Eighty-Four.

Memory hole may also refer to:

 Memory Hole 1, a radio program
 Memory Hole (Quibi show), a show on Quibi hosted by Will Arnett
 Memory Hole (YouTube channel), a YouTube channel dedicated to finding supposedly rejected America's Funniest Home Videos tapes.

Computing
 The PCI hole, a limitation that causes a computer to appear to have less memory available than is physically installed
 The Memory Hole (website) founded in 2002